is a subway station on the Toei Asakusa Line, operated by the Toei. It is located in Sumida, Tokyo, Japan. Its number is A-19.

Station layout
Honjo-azumabashi Station has two side platforms serving two tracks.

Platforms

History

Honjo-azumabashi Station opened on December 4, 1960, as a station on Toei Line 1. In 1978, the line was given its present name.

Surrounding area
The station serves the Azumabashi bridge neighborhood. Nearby are the local police station, the Sumida Ward office (city hall), and the headquarters of Asahi Breweries.

References

Railway stations in Japan opened in 1960
Railway stations in Tokyo
Toei Asakusa Line
Buildings and structures in Sumida, Tokyo